Whir can refer to:

WHIR radio station in Danville, Kentucky
Whir, a track on the album Pisces Iscariot

See also
Whirl (disambiguation)